Fairview Lake is a  natural lake located in Palmyra Township, Pike County, Pennsylvania in the United States, just south of Lake Wallenpaupack.

The lake has a maximum depth of 48 feet. The lake is home to one of the most distinctive land forms in the state - running through the middle of this waterway is a ridge over which the water is only three to five feet deep.

The lake is a prime fishing and boating area.  Boating is permitted on the lake, and gas motors are permitted. The Pennsylvania Fish and Boat Commission maintains a small boat launch facility on the southwestern corner of the lake, capacity approximately 10 cars with trailers. Boat access can be reached by taking SR 0390 north from I-84 to SR 4004.

References

See also
List of lakes in Pennsylvania

Lakes of Pennsylvania
Rivers of Pike County, Pennsylvania